Lisa O'Neill may refer to:

Lisa O'Neill (singer-songwriter), Irish  singer-songwriter
Lisa O'Neill (tennis), Australian tennis player
Lisa O'Neill, singer with Sing-Sing